Ira Mukhoty is an Indian author. She studied natural sciences at University of Cambridge.

Her book Heroines: Powerful Indian Women of Myth and History (2017,) tells the tales of mythical heroines including Draupadi and Radha, and "six real women who played extraordinary roles but who weren’t written into textbooks as were their male counterparts", including Jahanara Begum, Rani Laxmibai and Hazrat Mahal.

Her second book Daughters of the Sun: Empresses, Queens and Begums of the Mughal Empire which was about the disappeared women of the great Mughals, was published by Aleph Book Company on 25 April 2018. In  2020 she published Akbar: The Great Mughal (Aleph Book Company). A reviewer in the Asian Review of Books described it as "an ambitious work crafted with great imagination about how the past and the present intersect".

In 2021, her debut novel Song of Draupadi was published. The book reimagines Mahabharata through the narration of its women characters, particularly Draupadi.

References

Year of birth missing (living people)
Living people
Alumni of the University of Cambridge
21st-century Indian writers
21st-century Indian women writers